Bhagat Singh (27 September 1907 – 23 March 1931) was a charismatic Indian revolutionary who participated in the mistaken murder of a junior British police officer in what was to be retaliation for the death of an Indian nationalist. He later took part in a largely symbolic bombing of the Central Legislative Assembly in Delhi and a hunger strike in jail, which—on the back of sympathetic coverage in Indian-owned newspapers—turned him into a household name in the Punjab region, and after his execution at age 23 into a martyr and folk hero in Northern India. Borrowing ideas from Bolshevism and anarchism, he electrified a growing militancy in India in the 1930s, and prompted urgent introspection within the Indian National Congress's nonviolent but eventually successful campaign for India's independence.

In December 1928, Bhagat Singh and an associate, Shivaram Rajguru, both members of a small revolutionary group, the Hindustan Socialist Republican Association (also Army, or HSRA),  shot dead a 21-year-old British police officer, John Saunders, in Lahore, Punjab, in what is today Pakistan, mistaking Saunders, who was still on probation, for the British senior police superintendent, James Scott, whom they had intended to assassinate. They held Scott responsible for the death of a popular Indian nationalist leader Lala Lajpat Rai for having ordered a lathi (baton) charge in which Rai was injured and two weeks thereafter died of a heart attack.  As Saunders exited a police station on a motorcycle, he was felled by a single bullet fired from across the street by Rajguru, a marksman.  As he lay injured, he was shot at close range several times by Singh, the postmortem report showing eight bullet wounds. Another associate of Singh, Chandra Shekhar Azad, shot dead an Indian police head constable, Channan Singh, who attempted to give chase as Singh and Rajguru fled.

After having escaped, Bhagat Singh and his associates used pseudonyms to publicly announce avenging Lajpat Rai's death, putting up prepared posters that they had altered to show John Saunders as their intended target instead of James Scott.  Singh was thereafter on the run for many months, and no convictions resulted at the time. Surfacing again in April 1929, he and another associate, Batukeshwar Dutt, set off two low-intensity homemade bombs among some unoccupied benches of the Central Legislative Assembly in Delhi.  They showered leaflets from the gallery on the legislators below, shouted slogans, and allowed the authorities to arrest them.  The arrest, and the resulting publicity, brought to light Singh's complicity in the John Saunders case.  Awaiting trial, Singh gained public sympathy after he joined fellow defendant Jatin Das in a hunger strike, demanding better prison conditions for Indian prisoners, the strike ending in Das's death from starvation in September 1929.

Bhagat Singh was convicted of the murder of John Saunders and Channan Singh, and hanged in March 1931, aged 23. He became a popular folk hero after his death.  Jawaharlal Nehru wrote about him: "Bhagat Singh did not become popular because of his act of terrorism but because he seemed to vindicate, for the moment, the honour of Lala Lajpat Rai, and through him of the nation. He became a symbol; the act was forgotten, the symbol remained, and within a few months each town and village of the Punjab, and to a lesser extent in the rest of northern India, resounded with his name."  In still later years, Singh, an atheist and socialist in adulthood, won admirers in India from among a political spectrum that included both communists and right-wing Hindu nationalists.  Although many of Singh's associates, as well as many Indian anti-colonial revolutionaries, were also involved in daring acts and were either executed or died violent deaths, few came to be lionised in popular art and literature as did Singh, who is sometimes referred to as the Shaheed-e-Azam ("Great martyr" in Urdu and Punjabi).

Early life 
Bhagat Singh was born on 27 September 1907 in the village of Banga in the Lyallpur district of the Punjab in what was then British India and is today Pakistan; he was the second of seven children—four sons, and three daughters—born to Vidyavati and her husband Kishan Singh Sandhu.  Bhagat Singh's father and his uncle Ajit Singh were active in progressive politics, taking part in the agitation around the Canal Colonization Bill in 1907, and later the Ghadar Movement of 1914–1915.

After being sent to the village school in Banga for a few years, Bhagat Singh was enrolled in the Dayanand Anglo-Vedic School in Lahore. In 1923,  he joined the National College in Lahore, founded two years earlier by Lala Lajpat Rai in response to Mahatma Gandhi's non-cooperation movement, which urged Indian students to shun schools and colleges subsidized by the British Indian government.

Police became concerned with Singh's influence on youths and arrested him in May 1927 on the pretext that he had been involved in a bombing that had taken place in Lahore in October 1926. He was released on a surety of Rs. 60,000 five weeks after his arrest. He wrote for, and edited, Urdu and Punjabi newspapers, published in Amritsar and also contributed to low-priced pamphlets published by the Naujawan Bharat Sabha that excoriated the British.  He also wrote for Kirti, the journal of the Kirti Kisan Party ("Workers and Peasants Party") and briefly for the Veer Arjun newspaper, published in Delhi. He often used pseudonyms, including names such as Balwant, Ranjit and Vidhrohi.

Revolutionary activities

Killing of John Saunders 
In 1928, the British government set up the Simon Commission to report on the political situation in India. Some Indian political parties boycotted the Commission because there were no Indians in its membership, and there were protests across the country. When the Commission visited Lahore on 30 October 1928, Lala Lajpat Rai led a march in protest against it. Police attempts to disperse the large crowd resulted in violence. The superintendent of police, James A. Scott, ordered the police to lathi charge (use batons against) the protesters and personally assaulted Rai, who was injured. Rai died of a heart attack on 17 November 1928. Doctors thought that his death might have been hastened by the injuries he had received. When the matter was raised in the Parliament of the United Kingdom, the British Government denied any role in Rai's death.

Singh was a prominent member of the Hindustan Republican Association (HRA) and was probably responsible, in large part, for its change of name to Hindustan Socialist Republican Association (HSRA) in 1928. The HSRA vowed to avenge Rai's death. Singh conspired with revolutionaries like Shivaram Rajguru, Sukhdev Thapar, and Chandrashekhar Azad to kill Scott. However, in a case of mistaken identity, the plotters shot John P. Saunders, an Assistant Superintendent of Police, as he was leaving the District Police Headquarters in Lahore on 17 December 1928.

Contemporary reaction to the killing differs substantially from the adulation that later surfaced. The Naujawan Bharat Sabha, which had organised the Lahore protest march along with the HSRA, found that attendance at its subsequent public meetings dropped sharply. Politicians, activists, and newspapers, including The People, which Rai had founded in 1925, stressed that non-co-operation was preferable to violence. The murder was condemned as a retrograde action by Mahatma Gandhi, the Congress leader, but Jawaharlal Nehru later wrote that:

Killing of Channan Singh 
After killing Saunders, the group escaped through the D.A.V. College entrance, across the road from the District Police Headquarters. Chanan Singh, a Head Constable who was chasing them, was shot dead by Chandrashekhar Azad. They then fled on bicycles to pre-arranged safe houses. The police launched a massive search operation to catch them, blocking all entrances and exits to and from the city; the CID kept a watch on all young men leaving Lahore. The fugitives hid for the next two days. On 19 December 1928, Sukhdev called on Durgawati Devi, sometimes known as Durga Bhabhi, wife of another HSRA member, Bhagwati Charan Vohra, for help, which she agreed to provide. They decided to catch the train departing from Lahore to Bathinda en route to Howrah (Calcutta) early the next morning.

Escape from Lahore 
Bhagat Singh and Rajguru, both carrying loaded revolvers, left the house early the next day. Dressed in western attire (Bhagat Singh cut his hair, shaved his beard and wore a hat over cropped hair), and carrying Devi's sleeping child, Singh and Devi passed as a young couple, while Rajguru carried their luggage as their servant. At the station, Singh managed to conceal his identity while buying tickets, and the three boarded the train heading to Cawnpore (now Kanpur). There they boarded a train for Lucknow since the CID at Howrah railway station usually scrutinised passengers on the direct train from Lahore. At Lucknow, Rajguru left separately for Benares while Singh, Devi and the infant went to Howrah, with all except Singh returning to Lahore a few days later.

Delhi Assembly bombing and arrest 
For some time, Bhagat Singh had been exploiting the power of drama as a means to inspire the revolt against the British, purchasing a magic lantern to show slides that enlivened his talks about revolutionaries such as Ram Prasad Bismil who had died as a result of the Kakori conspiracy. In 1929, he proposed a dramatic act to the HSRA intended to gain massive publicity for their aims. Influenced by Auguste Vaillant, a French anarchist who had bombed the Chamber of Deputies in Paris, Singh's plan was to explode a bomb inside the Central Legislative Assembly. The nominal intention was to protest against the Public Safety Bill, and the Trade Dispute Act, which had been rejected by the Assembly but were being enacted by the Viceroy using his special powers; the actual intention was for the perpetrators to allow themselves to be arrested so that they could use court appearances as a stage to publicise their cause.

The HSRA leadership was initially opposed to Bhagat's participation in the bombing because they were certain that his prior involvement in the Saunders shooting meant that his arrest would ultimately result in his execution. However, they eventually decided that he was their most suitable candidate. On 8 April 1929, Singh, accompanied by Batukeshwar Dutt, threw two bombs into the Assembly chamber from its public gallery while it was in session. The bombs had been designed not to kill, but some members, including George Ernest Schuster, the finance member of the Viceroy's Executive Council, were injured. The smoke from the bombs filled the Assembly so that Singh and Dutt could probably have escaped in the confusion had they wished. Instead, they stayed shouting the slogan "Inquilab Zindabad!" ("Long Live the Revolution") and threw leaflets. The two men were arrested and subsequently moved through a series of jails in Delhi.

Assembly case trial 
According to Neeti Nair, "public criticism of this terrorist action was unequivocal." Gandhi, once again, issued strong words of disapproval of their deed. Nonetheless, the jailed Bhagat was reported to be elated, and referred to the subsequent legal proceedings as a "drama". Singh and Dutt eventually responded to the criticism by writing the Assembly Bomb Statement: 

The trial began in the first week of June, following a preliminary hearing in May. On 12 June, both men were sentenced to life imprisonment for: "causing explosions of a nature likely to endanger life, unlawfully and maliciously." Dutt had been defended by Asaf Ali, while Singh defended himself. Doubts have been raised about the accuracy of testimony offered at the trial. One key discrepancy concerns the automatic pistol that Singh had been carrying when he was arrested. Some witnesses said that he had fired two or three shots while the police sergeant who arrested him testified that the gun was pointed downward when he took it from him and that Singh "was playing with it." According to an article in the India Law Journal, the prosecution witnesses were coached, their accounts were incorrect, and Singh had turned over the pistol himself. Singh was given a life sentence.

Arrest of associates 
In 1929, the HSRA had set up bomb factories in Lahore and Saharanpur. On 15 April 1929, the Lahore bomb factory was discovered by the police, leading to the arrest of other members of HSRA, including Sukhdev, Kishori Lal, and Jai Gopal. Not long after this, the Saharanpur factory was also raided and some of the conspirators became informants. With the new information available, the police were able to connect the three strands of the Saunders murder, Assembly bombing, and bomb manufacture. Singh, Sukhdev, Rajguru, and 21 others were charged with the Saunders murder.

Hunger strike and Lahore conspiracy case 
Singh was re-arrested for murdering Saunders and Chanan Singh based on substantial evidence against him, including statements by his associates, Hans Raj Vohra and Jai Gopal. His life sentence in the Assembly Bomb case was deferred until the Saunders case was decided. He was sent to Central Jail Mianwali from the Delhi jail. There he witnessed discrimination between European and Indian prisoners. He considered himself, along with others, to be a political prisoner. He noted that he had received an enhanced diet at Delhi which was not being provided at Mianwali. He led other Indian, self-identified political prisoners he felt were being treated as common criminals in a hunger strike. They demanded equality in food standards, clothing, toiletries, and other hygienic necessities, as well as access to books and a daily newspaper. They argued that they should not be forced to do manual labour or any undignified work in the jail.

The hunger strike inspired a rise in public support for Singh and his colleagues from around June 1929. The Tribune newspaper was particularly prominent in this movement and reported on mass meetings in places such as Lahore and Amritsar. The government had to apply Section 144 of the criminal code in an attempt to limit gatherings.

Jawaharlal Nehru met Singh and the other strikers in Central Jail Mianwali. After the meeting, he stated:

Muhammad Ali Jinnah spoke in support of the strikers in the Assembly, saying: 

The government tried to break the strike by placing different food items in the prison cells to test the prisoners' resolve. Water pitchers were filled with milk so that either the prisoners remained thirsty or broke their strike; nobody faltered and the impasse continued. The authorities then attempted force-feeding the prisoners but this was resisted. With the matter still unresolved, the Indian Viceroy, Lord Irwin, cut short his vacation in Simla to discuss the situation with jail authorities. Since the activities of the hunger strikers had gained popularity and attention amongst the people nationwide, the government decided to advance the start of the Saunders murder trial, which was henceforth called the Lahore Conspiracy Case. Singh was transported to Borstal Jail, Lahore, and the trial began there on 10 July 1929. In addition to charging them with the murder of Saunders, Singh and the 27 other prisoners were charged with plotting a conspiracy to murder Scott, and waging a war against the King. Singh, still on hunger strike, had to be carried to the court handcuffed on a stretcher; he had lost  from his original weight of  since beginning the strike.

The government was beginning to make concessions but refused to move on the core issue of recognising the classification of "political prisoner". In the eyes of officials, if someone broke the law then that was a personal act, not a political one, and they were common criminals. By now, the condition of another hunger striker, Jatindra Nath Das, lodged in the same jail, had deteriorated considerably. The Jail committee recommended his unconditional release, but the government rejected the suggestion and offered to release him on bail. On 13 September 1929, Das died after a 63-day hunger strike. Almost all the nationalist leaders in the country paid tribute to Das' death. Mohammad Alam and Gopi Chand Bhargava resigned from the Punjab Legislative Council in protest, and Nehru moved a successful adjournment motion in the Central Assembly as a censure against the "inhumane treatment" of the Lahore prisoners. Singh finally heeded a resolution of the Congress party, and a request by his father, ending his hunger strike on 5 October 1929 after 116 days. During this period, Singh's popularity among common Indians extended beyond Punjab.

Singh's attention now turned to his trial, where he was to face a Crown prosecution team comprising C. H. Carden-Noad, Kalandar Ali Khan, Jai Gopal Lal, and the prosecuting inspector, Bakshi Dina Nath. The defence was composed of eight lawyers. Prem Dutt Verma, the youngest amongst the 27 accused, threw his slipper at Gopal when he turned and became a prosecution witness in court. As a result, the magistrate ordered that all the accused should be handcuffed. Singh and others refused to be handcuffed and were subjected to brutal beating. The revolutionaries refused to attend the court and Singh wrote a letter to the magistrate citing various reasons for their refusal. The magistrate ordered the trial to proceed without the accused or members of the HSRA. This was a setback for Singh as he could no longer use the trial as a forum to publicise his views.

Special Tribunal 
To speed up the slow trial, the Viceroy, Lord Irwin, declared an emergency on 1 May 1930 and introduced an ordinance to set up a special tribunal composed of three high court judges for the case. This decision cut short the normal process of justice as the only appeal after the tribunal was to the Privy Council located in England.

On 2 July 1930, a habeas corpus petition was filed in the High Court challenging the ordinance on the grounds that it was ultra vires and, therefore, illegal; the Viceroy had no powers to shorten the customary process of determining justice. The petition argued that the Defence of India Act 1915 allowed the Viceroy to introduce an ordinance, and set up such a tribunal, only under conditions of a breakdown of law-and-order, which, it was claimed in this case, had not occurred. However, the petition was dismissed as being premature.

Carden-Noad presented the government's charges of conducting robberies, and the illegal acquisition of arms and ammunition among others. The evidence of G. T. H. Hamilton Harding, the Lahore superintendent of police, shocked the court. He stated that he had filed the first information report against the accused under specific orders from the chief secretary to the governor of Punjab and that he was unaware of the details of the case. The prosecution depended mainly on the evidence of P. N. Ghosh, Hans Raj Vohra, and Jai Gopal who had been Singh's associates in the HSRA. On 10 July 1930, the tribunal decided to press charges against only 15 of the 18 accused and allowed their petitions to be taken up for hearing the next day. The trial ended on 30 September 1930. The three accused, whose charges were withdrawn, included Dutt who had already been given a life sentence in the Assembly bomb case.

The ordinance (and the tribunal) would lapse on 31 October 1930 as it had not been passed by the Central Assembly or the British Parliament. On 7 October 1930, the tribunal delivered its 300-page judgement based on all the evidence and concluded that the participation of Singh, Sukhdev, and Rajguru in Saunder's murder was proven. They were sentenced to death by hanging. Of the other accused, three were acquitted (Ajoy Ghosh, Jatindra Nath Sanyal and Des Raj), Kundan Lal received seven years' rigorous imprisonment, Prem Dutt received five years of the same, and the remaining seven (Kishori Lal, Mahabir Singh, Bijoy Kumar Sinha, Shiv Verma, Gaya Prasad, Jai Dev and Kamalnath Tewari) were all sentenced to transportation for life.

Appeal to the Privy Council 
In Punjab province, a defence committee drew up a plan to appeal to the Privy Council. Singh was initially against the appeal but later agreed to it in the hope that the appeal would popularise the HSRA in Britain. The appellants claimed that the ordinance which created the tribunal was invalid while the government countered that the Viceroy was completely empowered to create such a tribunal. The appeal was dismissed by Judge Viscount Dunedin.

Reactions to the judgement 
After the rejection of the appeal to the Privy Council, Congress party president Madan Mohan Malaviya filed a mercy appeal before Irwin on 14 February 1931. Some prisoners sent Mahatma Gandhi an appeal to intervene. In his notes dated 19 March 1931, the Viceroy recorded:

The Communist Party of Great Britain expressed its reaction to the case:

A plan to rescue Singh and fellow HSRA inmates from the jail failed. HSRA member Durga Devi's husband, Bhagwati Charan Vohra, attempted to manufacture bombs for the purpose, but died when they exploded accidentally.

Execution 

Singh, Rajguru and Sukhdev were sentenced to death in the Lahore conspiracy case and ordered to be hanged on 24 March 1931. The schedule was moved forward by 11 hours and the three were hanged on 23 March 1931 at 7:30 pm in the Lahore jail. It is reported that no magistrate at the time was willing to supervise Singh's hanging as was required by law. The execution was supervised instead by an honorary judge, who also signed the three death warrants, as their original warrants had expired.

Criticism of the tribunal trial 
Singh's trial has been described by the Supreme Court as "contrary to the fundamental doctrine of criminal jurisprudence" because there was no opportunity for the accused to defend themselves. The Special Tribunal was a departure from the normal procedure adopted for a trial and its decision could only be appealed to the Privy Council located in Britain. The accused were absent from the court and the judgement was passed ex-parte. The ordinance, which was introduced by the Viceroy to form the Special Tribunal, was never approved by the Central Assembly or the British Parliament, and it eventually lapsed without any legal or constitutional sanctity.

Reactions to the executions 

The executions were reported widely by the press, especially as they took place on the eve of the annual convention of the Congress party at Karachi. Gandhi faced black flag demonstrations by angry youths who shouted "Down with Gandhi". The New York Times reported:

Hartals and strikes of mourning were called. The Congress party, during the Karachi session, declared:

In the issue of Young India of 29 March 1931, Gandhi wrote:

Gandhi's role

On March 23, Mahatama Gandhi had written letter to viceroy in which he appealed for commutation for the death sentences against Bhagat Singh, Sukhdev and Rajguru. However, there have been unfounded claims that Gandhi had an opportunity to stop Singh's execution. In contrast, it is held that Gandhi did not have enough influence with the British to stop the execution, much less arrange it, but that he did his best to save Singh's life. Gandhi supporters assert that Singh's role in the independence movement was no threat to Gandhi's role as its leader, so he would have no reason to want him dead. Gandhi always maintained that he was a great admirer of Singh's patriotism. He also stated that he was opposed to Singh's execution (and for that matter, capital punishment in general) and proclaimed that he had no power to stop it. Of Singh's execution Gandhi said: "The government certainly had the right to hang these men. However, there are some rights which do credit to those who possess them only if they are enjoyed in name only." Gandhi also once remarked about capital punishment: "I cannot in all conscience agree to anyone being sent to the gallows. God alone can take life, because he alone gives it." Gandhi had managed to have 90,000 political prisoners, who were not members of his Satyagraha movement, released under the Gandhi–Irwin Pact. According to a report in the Indian magazine Frontline, he did plead several times for the commutation of the death sentences of Singh, Rajguru and Sukhdev, including a personal visit on 19 March 1931. In a letter to the Viceroy on the day of their execution, he pleaded fervently for commutation, not knowing that the letter would arrive too late. Lord Irwin, the Viceroy, later said:

Ideals and opinions

Communism 
Singh regarded Kartar Singh Sarabha, the founding-member of the Ghadar Party as his hero. Bhagat was also inspired by Bhai Parmanand, another founding-member of the Ghadar Party. Singh was attracted to anarchism and communism. He was an avid reader of the teachings of Mikhail Bakunin and also read Karl Marx, Vladimir Lenin and Leon Trotsky. In his last testament, "To Young Political Workers", he declares his ideal as the "Social reconstruction on new, i.e., Marxist, basis". Singh did not believe in the Gandhian ideology – which advocated Satyagraha and other forms of non-violent resistance, and felt that such politics would replace one set of exploiters with another.

From May to September 1928, Singh published a series of articles on anarchism in Kirti. He was concerned that the public misunderstood the concept of anarchism, writing that: "The people are scared of the word anarchism. The word anarchism has been abused so much that even in India revolutionaries have been called anarchist to make them unpopular." He clarified that anarchism refers to the absence of a ruler and abolition of the state, not the absence of order. He went on to say: "I think in India the idea of universal brotherhood, the Sanskrit sentence Vasudhaiva Kutumbakam etc., has the same meaning." He believed that: 

On 21 January 1930, during the trial of the Lahore Conspiracy Case, Bhagat Singh and his HSRA comrades, appeared in the court wearing red scarves. When the magistrate took his chair, they raised slogans "Long Live Socialist Revolution", "Long Live Communist International", "Long Live People" "Lenin's Name Will Never Die", and "Down with Imperialism". Bhagat Singh then read the text of a telegram in the court and asked the magistrate to send it to the Third International. The telegram stated: 

Historian K. N. Panikkar described Singh as one of the early Marxists in India. The political theorist Jason Adams notes that he was more enamoured with Lenin than with Marx. From 1926 onward, he studied the history of the revolutionary movements in India and abroad. In his prison notebooks, he quoted Lenin in reference to imperialism and capitalism and also the revolutionary thoughts of Trotsky.

On the day his execution, Bhagat Singh was reading the book, Reminiscences of Lenin, authored by Clara Zetkin, a German Marxist. When asked what his last wish was, Singh replied that he was studying the life of Lenin and he wanted to finish it before his death.

Atheism 
Singh began to question religious ideologies after witnessing the Hindu–Muslim riots that broke out after Gandhi disbanded the Non-Cooperation Movement. He did not understand how members of these two groups, initially united in fighting against the British, could be at each other's throats because of their religious differences. At this point, Singh dropped his religious beliefs, since he believed religion hindered the revolutionaries' struggle for independence, and began studying the works of Bakunin, Lenin, Trotsky – all atheist revolutionaries. He also took an interest in Soham Swami's book Common Sense.

While in prison in 1930–31, Bhagat Singh was approached by Randhir Singh, a fellow inmate, and a Sikh leader who would later found the Akhand Kirtani Jatha. According to Bhagat Singh's close associate Shiva Verma, who later compiled and edited his writings, Randhir Singh tried to convince Bhagat Singh of the existence of God, and upon failing berated him: "You are giddy with fame and have developed an ego that is standing like a black curtain between you and God". In response, Bhagat Singh wrote an essay entitled "Why I Am an Atheist" to address the question of whether his atheism was born out of vanity. In the essay, he defended his own beliefs and said that he used to be a firm believer in the Almighty, but could not bring himself to believe the myths and beliefs that others held close to their hearts. He acknowledged the fact that religion made death easier, but also said that unproven philosophy is a sign of human weakness. In this context, he noted:

Towards the end of the essay, Bhagat Singh wrote:

"Killing the ideas" 
In the leaflet he threw in the Central Assembly on 8 April 1929, he stated: "It is easy to kill individuals but you cannot kill the ideas. Great empires crumbled, while the ideas survived." While in prison, Singh and two others had written a letter to Lord Irwin, wherein they asked to be treated as prisoners of war and consequently to be executed by firing squad and not by hanging. Prannath Mehta, Singh's friend, visited him in the jail on 20 March, three days before his execution, with a draft letter for clemency, but he declined to sign it.

Popularity 

Subhas Chandra Bose said that: "Bhagat Singh had become the symbol of the new awakening among the youths." Nehru acknowledged that Bhagat Singh's popularity was leading to a new national awakening, saying: "He was a clean fighter who faced his enemy in the open field ... he was like a spark that became a flame in a short time and spread from one end of the country to the other dispelling the prevailing darkness everywhere". Four years after Singh's hanging, the Director of the Intelligence Bureau, Sir Horace Williamson, wrote: "His photograph was on sale in every city and township and for a time rivaled in popularity even that of Mr. Gandhi himself".

See also 
 Udham Singh
 Kartar Singh Sarabha
 Harnam Singh Saini
 Dharam Singh Hayatpur
 Martyrdom in Sikhism

Legacy and memorials 

Bhagat Singh remains a significant figure in Indian iconography to the present day. His memory, however, defies categorisation and presents problems for various groups that might try to appropriate it. Pritam Singh, a professor who has specialised in the study of federalism, nationalism and development in India, notes that 
 On 15 August 2008, an 18-foot tall bronze statue of Singh was installed in the Parliament of India, next to the statues of Indira Gandhi and Subhas Chandra Bose. A portrait of Singh and Dutt also adorns the walls of the Parliament House.

 The place where Singh was cremated, at Hussainiwala on the banks of the Sutlej river, became Pakistani territory during the partition. On 17 January 1961, it was transferred to India in exchange for 12 villages near the Sulemanki Headworks. Batukeshwar Dutt was cremated there on 19 July 1965 in accordance with his last wishes, as was Singh's mother, Vidyawati. The National Martyrs Memorial was built on the cremation spot in 1968 and has memorials of Singh, Rajguru and Sukhdev. During the 1971 India–Pakistan war, the memorial was damaged and the statues of the martyrs were removed by the Pakistani Army. They have not been returned but the memorial was rebuilt in 1973.
 The Shaheedi Mela (Punjabi: Martyrdom Fair) is an event held annually on 23 March when people pay homage at the National Martyrs Memorial. The day is also observed across the Indian state of Punjab.
 The Shaheed-e-Azam Sardar Bhagat Singh Museum opened on the 50th anniversary of his death at his ancestral village, Khatkar Kalan. Exhibits include Singh's ashes, the blood-soaked sand, and the blood-stained newspaper in which the ashes were wrapped. A page of the first Lahore Conspiracy Case's judgement in which Kartar Singh Sarabha was sentenced to death and on which Singh put some notes is also displayed, as well as a copy of the Bhagavad Gita with Bhagat Singh's signature, which was given to him in the Lahore Jail, and other personal belongings.
 The Supreme Court of India established a museum to display landmarks in the history of India's judicial system, displaying records of some historic trials. The first exhibition that was organised was the Trial of Bhagat Singh, which opened on 28 September 2007, on the centenary celebrations of Singh's birth.

Modern days 

The youth of India still draw tremendous amount of inspiration from Singh. He was voted the "Greatest Indian" in a poll by the Indian magazine India Today in 2008, ahead of Bose and Gandhi. During the centenary of his birth, a group of intellectuals set up an institution named Bhagat Singh Sansthan to commemorate him and his ideals. The Parliament of India paid tributes and observed silence as a mark of respect in memory of Singh on 23 March 2001 and 2005. In Pakistan, after a long-standing demand by activists from the Bhagat Singh Memorial Foundation of Pakistan, the Shadman Chowk square in Lahore, where he was hanged, was renamed as Bhagat Singh Chowk. This change was successfully challenged in a Pakistani court. On 6 September 2015, the Bhagat Singh Memorial Foundation filed a petition in the Lahore high court and again demanded the renaming of the Chowk to Bhagat Singh Chowk.

Films and television 
Several films have been made portraying the life and times of Singh. The first film based on his life was Shaheed-e-Azad Bhagat Singh (1954) in which Prem Adeeb played the role of Singh followed by Shaheed Bhagat Singh (1963), starring Shammi Kapoor as Bhagat Singh, Shaheed (1965) in which Manoj Kumar portrayed Bhagat Singh and Amar Shaheed Bhagat Singh (1974) in which Som Dutt portrays Singh. Three films about Singh were released in 2002 Shaheed-E-Azam, 23 March 1931: Shaheed and The Legend of Bhagat Singh in which Singh was portrayed by Sonu Sood, Bobby Deol and Ajay Devgn respectively. Bhagat Singh (2002), a drama film directed by Anand Sagar and written/produced Ramanand Sagar was aired on DD National. It featured Deepak Dutta in the titular role.

Siddharth played the role of Bhagat Singh in the 2006 film Rang De Basanti, a film drawing parallels between revolutionaries of Bhagat Singh's era and modern Indian youth. Another similar approach was taken in the independent film, among others, Shaheed-E-Aazam (2018) where Rahul Pathak played the lead role. Gurdas Mann played the role of Singh in Shaheed Udham Singh, a film based on life of Udham Singh while Amol Parashar portrayed Singh in Sardar Udham, another film based on Udham Singh's life. Karam Rajpal portrayed Bhagat Singh in Star Bharat's television series Chandrashekhar, which is based on life of Chandra Shekhar Azad.

In 2008, Nehru Memorial Museum and Library (NMML) and Act Now for Harmony and Democracy (ANHAD), a non-profit organisation, co-produced a 40-minute documentary on Bhagat Singh entitled Inqilab, directed by Gauhar Raza.

Theatre 
Singh, Sukhdev and Rajguru have been the inspiration for a number of plays in India and Pakistan, that continue to attract crowds.

Songs 
Although not written by Singh, the patriotic Hindustani songs, "Sarfaroshi Ki Tamanna" ("The desire to sacrifice") created by Bismil Azimabadi, and "Mera Rang De Basanti Chola" ("O Mother! Dye my robe the colour of spring") created by Ram Prasad Bismil, are largely associated with him and have been used in a number of related films.

Other 
In 1968, a postage stamp was issued in India commemorating the 61st birth anniversary of Singh. A ₹5 coin commemorating him was released for circulation in 2012.

Books

References

Notes

Citations

Works cited and bibliography

External links 

 Bhagat Singh biography, and letters written by Bhagat Singh
 His Violence Wasn't Just About Killing, Outlook
 The indomitable courage and sacrifice of Bhagat Singh and his comrades will continue to inspire people, The Tribune
 Tracing the Martyr's Footsteps in Lahore, The Quint

1907 births
1931 deaths
20th-century executions by British India
Executed Indian people
Executed revolutionaries
Former Sikhs
Hindustan Socialist Republican Association
Hunger strikers
Indian anti-capitalists
Indian atheism activists
Indian communists
Indian nationalists
Indian revolutionaries
People executed by British India by hanging
People executed for murdering police officers
People from Jaranwala
Punjabi people
Revolutionary movement for Indian independence
Indian anarchists
Executed anarchists